The languages of the African Union are languages used by citizens within the member states of the African Union (AU). For languages of the institution, see African Union: Languages.

Overview
The African Union has not legally defined specific working languages, though they do say that the working languages "shall be, if possible, African languages, Arabic, English, French and Portuguese." The prominence of Arabic in many African countries is due to the Arab expansion into Africa from the 7th century, with subsequent Arabization of local populations. Indo-European languages were introduced during the European colonisation from the 15th century. 

In 2001, the AU created the African Academy of Languages (ACALAN) to harmonize the various languages across the continent and safeguard any that are on the verge of becoming extinct. To that end, the AU declared 2006 the Year of African Languages. 2006 also marked Ghana's 55th anniversary since it founded the Bureau of Ghana Languages originally known as Gold Coast Vernacular Literature Bureau.

Languages of AU states
 – The Constitution of Algeria defines the official languages as Arabic and Berber. French is spoken by governmental and educational elite. There is also an Algerian Sign Language. (Languages of Algeria)
 – Portuguese is the official language, and many people speak one or several of 41 Bantu or Khoisan languages. (Languages of Angola)
 – French is the official language, with Fon and Yoruba being the most common languages in the south. At least six major languages are spoken in the north. (Languages of Benin)
 – English and Tswana are the official languages, with Tswana being the most common national language. (Languages of Botswana)
 – French is the official language. Mossi, Dyula and Fula are the national languages. Most speak one of the Sudanic languages. (Languages of Burkina Faso)
 – French and Kirundi are co-official. Many persons also speak Swahili. (Languages of Burundi)
 – English and French are co-official, with Cameroonian Pidgin English widely spoken. Twenty-four major African language families and sub-groups are present in Cameroon. Cameroon is one of the most linguistically diverse areas in the world. (Languages of Cameroon)
 – Portuguese is official. The officialization of Cape Verdean Creole is under discussion.
 – French and Sango are co-official; the former is the lingua franca. Sango is the local language with the most speakers, 70 languages are listed in the Ethnologue report for the country. (Languages of the Central African Republic)
 – Arabic and French are co-official, with over 120 other languages spoken. (Languages of Chad)
 – Arabic, French, and Comorian are co-official; the latter is a Swahili dialect, albeit heavily influenced by Arabic and French. (Languages of Comoros)
 – French is official, with four national languages: Kikongo, Lingala, Swahili, and Tshiluba. There are an estimated total of 242 languages spoken in the DRC. (Languages of the Democratic Republic of the Congo)
 – French is official, but is only spoken by the cultural elite. Lingala and Kituba are national linguae francae; the latter is a creole of Kikongo. (Languages of the Republic of the Congo)
 – French is official, with some 60 indigenous languages, of which the Dioula dialect of Bambara is the most widely spoken. Other languages include: the Gur languages, the Kru languages (including the Bété languages, Dida, Nyabwa, Wè, and Western Krahn), and the Kwa languages. (Languages of Côte d'Ivoire)
 – Arabic and French are co-official; Afar and Somali are widely spoken. (Languages of Djibouti)
 – Arabic is official, with Egyptian Arabic being the most common spoken language. English and French are major languages for education and trade. See languages of Egypt
 – Spanish, French and Portuguese are official. Other languages include Annobonese, Bubi, Fang, Igbo, and Pichinglis. (Languages of Equatorial Guinea)
 – There is no official language per se, but Arabic, English, Italian and Tigrinya are used by the government. Other common languages include Afar, Bilen, Kunama, Nara, Saho, Tigre and Beja. Ge'ez is the liturgical language of the Eritrean Orthodox Tewahedo Church.  (Languages of Eritrea)
 – Afar, Amharic, Oromo, Somali and Tigrinya are official, among more than 80 languages spoken. English is widely spoken and taught in secondary school. (Languages of Ethiopia)
 – French is official, and many African languages are spoken. (Languages of Gabon)
 – English is official, and many African languages are also spoken, notably Wolof. (Languages of The Gambia)
 – English is official, Akan, Dagaare/Wale, Dagbane, Dangme, Ewe, Ga, Gonja, Kasem and Nzema are government-recognized languages sponsored by the Bureau of Ghana Languages. (Languages of Ghana)
 – French is official, Fula (Pular), Mandinka and Susu is the lingua franca. (Languages of Guinea)
 – Portuguese is official, but the most widely spoken language is a Portuguese-based creole language, Kriol. (Languages of Guinea-Bissau)
 – Swahili and English are official, and many other African languages are also spoken. (Languages of Kenya)
 – Sesotho and English are official. (Languages of Lesotho)
 – English is official, many African languages are spoken. (Languages of Liberia)
 – Arabic is official, Tamazight is spoken by about 10% of the population. Italian is understood by some older Libyans. (Languages of Libya)
 – Malagasy, French are official. (Languages of Madagascar)
 – Chewa language, Tumbuka language and English are official. (Languages of Malawi)
 – French is official, Bambara is the primary lingua franca. Of the 50 languages spoken, 13 are classified national languages, including Bambara, Fula, Sonrai, and Soninke (Languages of Mali)
 – Arabic is official; other languages spoken include: Pulaar, Soninke, and Wolof. (Languages of Mauritania). French is used by upper classes.
 – English is the de jure official language but French is more widely spoken, making it the de facto official language. The vernacular language is Mauritian Creole which derives from French. Tamil, Hindi and other Indian languages are spoken by the Indian community. Arabic, Portuguese and a number of Chinese varieties like Hakka and Mandarin are also spoken by some. (Languages of Mauritius)
 – Arabic and Berber. French is also widely spoken. (Languages of Morocco)
 – Portuguese is the official language. Makua, Sena, Ndau, Xitsonga and Swahili are spoken by a sizable amount of the population. The educated often speak English as a second or third language. The Arab, Indian and Chinese communities speak their own languages. (Languages of Mozambique)
 – The official language is English. Oshiwambo, Khoekhoegowab, Otjiherero, RuKwangali and siLozi are regional languages. Most Whites in Namibia speak Afrikaans or German which were the official languages before independence. (Languages of Namibia)
 – French is the official language. Hausa, Djerma, Tamajaq, Fulfulde are important African languages. (Languages of Niger)
 – English is the official language, Hausa, Igbo, Yoruba, Efik, Edo, Adamawa, Fulfulde, Idoma, and Central Kanuri are all widely spoken. 510 languages currently exist with native speakers in Nigeria. (Languages of Nigeria)
 – Kinyarwanda, French, and English are official languages. Kinyarwanda is the mother tongue of the vast majority of the population. (Languages of Rwanda). French and English are only spoken by a minority, and Swahili is used as a vehicular language.
  – The official languages are Arabic and Spanish. (Languages of Western Sahara)
 – Portuguese is the official language, spoken by 95% of the population. Other languages include the Portuguese-based creoles Forro (85%), Angolar (3%) and Principense (0.1%). (Languages of São Tomé and Príncipe)
 – French is the official language, used regularly by a minority of Senegalese educated in a system styled upon the colonial-era schools of French origin. Most persons also speak their own ethnic language while, especially in Dakar, Wolof is the lingua franca. Pulaar is spoken by the Fulas and Toucouleur (Halpulaar). Various Portuguese Creoles are spoken in Senegal by those from Guinea-Bissau and São Tomé and Príncipe. (Languages of Senegal)
 – English, French and Seychellois Creole are official. As Seychelles had no indigenous population, many languages are spoken by the various African, Chinese, European, and Indian peoples who colonized it. Seychellois Creole is the lingua franca between these groups. (Languages of Seychelles)
 – English is the official language but it is only understood by a minority. Most persons speak their ethnic language, Krio. (Languages of Sierra Leone)
 – Somali and Arabic are official. Somali is the most spoken language. Other Afro-Asiatic languages are also spoken in some areas, such as Maay, Dabarre, and Tunni. In addition, some Niger–Congo languages are spoken by ethnic minorities in parts of the south, including Chimwiini and Kibajuni (two variants of Swahili) as well as Mushunguli. English is also widely used and taught in schools. Italian used to be a major language, but its influence significantly diminished following independence. (Languages of Somalia)
 – South Africa has 11 official languages: Afrikaans, English, Southern Ndebele, Pedi, Sotho, Swati, Tsonga, Tswana, Venda, Xhosa, and Zulu. Before 1994 during the Apartheid era, only Afrikaans and English had official status. (Languages of South Africa)
 – English is official. Juba Arabic, Bari, Dinka, Luo, Murle, Nuer, Zande and 60 languages are spoken. (Languages of South Sudan)
 – Arabic and English are the official languages. Many African languages are spoken in both North and South Sudan. (Languages of Sudan)
 – English and siSwati are the official languages.  Zulu is widely spoken in the southern region of the country. (Languages of Eswatini)
 – English and Swahili are official. Nevertheless, only the latter is a real lingua franca. Gujarati is spoken by many in the Indian community. About 120 indigenous languages from all the four language families of Africa are spoken. (Languages of Tanzania)
 – French is the official language. Ewe and Kabiye are national languages. (Languages of Togo)
 – Classical Arabic is official, French is often used as a language of commerce. A small percentage speaks the Berber language, with its varieties like Tamezret-Berber, Matmata-Berber, Sened-Berber (may be extinct) and Djerbi-Berber. (Languages of Tunisia)
 – English and Swahili are official. Nonetheless, Swahili is not the most widely used vernacular language despite being the vehicular language of the populace. Indeed, Ganda is the most spoken language. Minoritiy languages include Soga, Nkole, Kiga, Teso, Masaba, Nyoro (Languages of Uganda)
 – English is the official language, many African languages are spoken by the country's roughly 72 different ethnic groups, with Nyanja being the most widely spoken. (Languages of Zambia)
 – English is the official language, but is the native language of only 2% of the population, while Shona, Northern Ndebele and Kalanga are spoken by the majority of the population. (Languages of Zimbabwe)

See also
Languages of the European Union
Bureau of Ghana Languages

References

External links
 African Academy of Languages
 All African languages by countries

African Union
Languages of Africa
Africa